Marko Jovanović may refer to:

 Marko Jovanović (basketball) (born 1982), Serbian professional basketball player
 Marko Jovanović (footballer, born 1978), Serbian football forward
 Marko Jovanović (footballer, born 1988), Serbian football defender
 Marko Jovanović (footballer, born 1989), Serbian football midfielder